Glenelg Edward Dishman (born November 5, 1970) is an American former professional baseball left-handed pitcher, who played in Major League Baseball (MLB) for the San Diego Padres, Philadelphia Phillies, and Detroit Tigers.

Career

Amateur
Dishman attended Moreau Catholic High School in Hayward, California and went to college at University of California Berkeley and Texas Christian University.

San Diego Padres
Dishman was signed as an undrafted free agent by the San Diego Padres on May 23, 1993 and reported to their Class-A minor league affiliate at Spokane for the 1993 season. He compiled a record of 6–3, a 2.20 earned run average (ERA) in 12 starts (with 2 complete game shut outs) that season and was selected as  a "Short Season A All-Star" and a Northwest League All-Star. On July 17, Dishman pitched a no-hitter against Yakima. He came within one out of a perfect game, but his first baseman committed an error.

In 1994, with the Double-A Wichita Wranglers, Dishman was 11–8 in 27 starts with a 2.82 ERA and was a Texas League All-Star. In 1995, with the Las Vegas Stars, he was 6–3 in 14 starts with a 2.55 ERA and won Pacific Coast League (PCL) All-Star honors.

Dishman made his major league debut on June 22, 1995, for the Padres against the Colorado Rockies as a starting pitcher. He worked 5 innings, allowed 3 earned runs, and received the loss as the Rockies defeated the Padres 3–2. In his next start, against the Los Angeles Dodgers on June 27 Dishman worked 6 innings, allowed 1 earned run, and recorded his first career victory.

Dishman alternated between the Padres and Las Vegas for the next couple of seasons.

Philadelphia Phillies
Dishman was picked up on waivers by the Philadelphia Phillies on September 12, 1996. He appeared in 4 games for the Phillies that season and was waived after the season.

Detroit Tigers
Signed by the Detroit Tigers for the 1997 season, Dishman spent most of the season with the AAA Toledo Mud Hens, appearing in 7 games for the Tigers, 4 as a starter.   Released by the Tigers after the season, he did not play in 1998.

Milwaukee Brewers
In 2000, Dishman attempted a comeback with the Milwaukee Brewers’ Double-A team, the Huntsville Stars, appearing in 42 games, all but one in relief.

Mexico/Western League
Dishman spent 2001 with the Reynosa Broncos in the Mexican League and the Sinon Bulls in the Taiwan Professional Baseball League.

Dishman pitched in 1999 and 2002 with the Sonoma County Crushers of the (independent) Western Baseball League.

Coaching
In 2003, Dishman began his coaching career, joining the staff at TCU (Texas Christian University). He then joined Ohlone College in Fremont, California for the 2003 season. He also coached in the Hawaiian Winter League in 2006 and the Venezuelan Winter League in 2011.

Dishman then joined the Los Angeles Dodgers organization as pitching coach for the Columbus Catfish (2005), the Vero Beach Dodgers (2006), Great Lakes Loons (2007,2015), Jacksonville Suns (2008), Chattanooga Lookouts (2009), and Albuquerque Isotopes (2010–2014). In 2014, Dishman was named as the PCL's pitching coach for their All-Star Game in Durham, North Carolina. In 2015, he was once again named the pitching coach for the Loons. The Dodgers released Dishman from his contract after the season.

From 2016-2017 Dishman served as the San Francisco Giants’ Phoenix, AZ rookie league team's pitching coach. For the 2018–19 seasons, he was pitching coach for the Giants’ Double-A Richmond Flying Squirrels affiliate. In 2020 he was the Pitching Coach for the Sacramento River Cats, AAA for the Giants.

In 2021 Dishman took a position with the MLB Draft League for their  inaugural season.  He was the Pitching Coach for the Frederick Keys.

Dishman, in 2022, has now taken a position with the Miami Marlins as their pitching coach with the Low A Jupiter Hammerheads.

References

External links

1970 births
Living people
American expatriate baseball players in Mexico
Baseball coaches from Maryland
Baseball players from Baltimore
Broncos de Reynosa players
Detroit Tigers players
Huntsville Stars players
Las Vegas Stars (baseball) players
Major League Baseball pitchers
Mexican League baseball pitchers
Minor league baseball coaches
Philadelphia Phillies players
Rancho Cucamonga Quakes players
San Diego Padres players
Sonoma County Crushers players
Spokane Indians players
Toledo Mud Hens players
TCU Horned Frogs baseball players
Wichita Wranglers players
Ohlone College alumni
American expatriate baseball players in Taiwan
Sinon Bulls players